Madhu is a town in Mannar District, Sri Lanka. The Shrine of Our Lady of Madhu, a major site of Roman Catholic pilgrimage, is located in this town.

Infrastructure
Madhu has a railway station (Madhu Road station) on the Mannar Line, with services to Medawachchiya.

Towns in Mannar District
Madhu DS Division